Onomyšl is a municipality and village in Kutná Hora District in the Central Bohemian Region of the Czech Republic. It has about 300 inhabitants.

Administrative parts
Villages and hamlets of Budy, Křečovice, Miletín and Rozkoš are administrative parts of Onomyšl.

References

Villages in Kutná Hora District